The Miles City Steam Laundry is a historic building in Miles City, Montana. It was added to the National Register of Historic Places on July 5, 1979. It was owned by Cyrus Hugg Mott. The building was demolished in 2011.

It was built in 1908 as a one-story building; a second floor was added c.1910-12; one-story additions were added later.  It was a -plan building.

References

Commercial buildings on the National Register of Historic Places in Montana
Buildings and structures in Miles City, Montana
National Register of Historic Places in Custer County, Montana
Buildings and structures demolished in 2011
Former laundry buildings
Buildings and structures completed in the 1910s
Demolished buildings and structures in Montana